Giurato is an Italian surname. Notable people with the surname include:

 Blasco Giurato (1941–2022), Italian cinematographer, brother of Luca
 Giuseppe Giurato, Italian fencer
 Luca Giurato (born 1939), Italian journalist and television presenter

Italian-language surnames